The Fyappiy, exonym: Kists/Nearby Kists—an Ingush society. The centre of the society was the aul of Metskhal, after which it was simultaneously called Metskhalin society and the inhabitants Metskhalins in the 2nd half of the 19th century. The region of historical settlement of Fyappiy was Fyappiy Mokhk.

History 
In the 17th century, the Fyappiy society was divided: some of its representatives went to Georgia, and some to Aukh. According to M. M. Zyazikov, the cultural center of the Aukh Vyappiy (Fyappiy) is the village of Ärzi in Ingushetia.

The historical area where the "Kists" lived was called "Kistetia", as well as "Kistia" or "Kistinia". The Georgian prince, historian and geographer of the 18th century Vakhushti Bagrationi localizes it along the gorge of the Armkhi river (historical "Kistinka"), that is in mountainous Ingushetia. In 1733 fearing the expansion of Ottoman Turks, Kists (Fyappiy) wrote Vakhtang VI a letter requesting for alliance, in which 16 Fyappin representatives from different surnames signed the letter.

Composition 
Torshkhoy, Korakhoy.

Surnames:

 Dzhabagiyevs
 Tarshkhoevs (Torshkhoevs)
 Sautievs
 Yevkurovs
 Yandievs
 Mamilovs
 Aldaganovs
 Matievs
 Beshtoevs
 Gazikovs
 Gutsarievs (Minkail, Gutseriev)
 Garakoevs
 Chileans
 Didigovs
 Karakhoevs
 Tankievs
 Kodzoevs (historian N. Kodzoev)
 Kotievs
 Loshkhoevs
 Mankievs
 Kushtovs
 Dodovs
 Shankhoevs
 Itazovs
 Dudarov and others

Notable people 
 Vassan-Girey Dzhabagiyev — Ingush educator, social thinker, major political and public figure, agricultural economist, sociologist, publicist.
 Yunus-bek Yevkurov — politician, former Head of Ingushetia.
 Mikhail Gutseriev — high-profile Ingush businessman.
 Issa Kodzoev — Ingush writer, poet, teacher.
 Dzhemaldin Yandiev — Ingush poet, member of the Union of Writers of the USSR.
  Tamara Yandieva — Ingush artist, singer.
 Ruslan Mamilow — Ingush artist, director, sculptor.
 Amur Amerkhanov — Ingush artist, director, singer.
 Nurdin Kodzoev — Ingush historian.
 Timur Matiev — Ingush historian, Ph.D., Head of the Department of History of the Ingush State University.
 Bersnako Gazikov — Ingush historian, archivist.
 Zarifa Sautieva — Ingush activist.
 Mukharbek Didigov — Ingush politician, statesman, engineer.
 Ahmed Kotiev — Ingush boxer, Minister of Physical Culture and Sports of the Republic of Ingushetia.
 Nazyr Mankiev — Ingush wrestler, 2008 Olympic gold medalist.

Aukh Fyappiy 
Fyappiy, Vyappiy — Ingush and Chechen teip living in Aukh, a region in Dagestan. The cultural center of the Vyappiy (Fyappiy) was Ärzi, located in Ingushetia. According to the teptar of the Vyappiy, they once lived in the village Tyarsh, located in Ingushetia.

Notes

References

Bibliography 
 
 
 
 
 
 
 
 
 
 
 
 
 
 
 
 
 

Nakh peoples
Ingush societies